The 2008–09 season (started 9 July 2008) is Enosis' 40th consecutive season in the Cypriot First Division. The team finished 6th in the league in the previous season. The first training session for the season took place at the training ground at Paralimni Municipal Stadium on 9 July 2008. Manager Marios Constantinou resigned the club in December 2008 due to the club's consecutive bad results of the team in the Cypriot First Division, and was replaced by Eduard Eranosyan.

Current squad 
Last Update: 31 December 2008

Transfers 2008/09 
In

Out

Winter Period
In:

Out:

Captains
  Demos Goumenos
  Marios Karas
  Panayiotis Spyrou
Source: enpfc.com

Foreign players
Teams in the Cypriot First Division can register up to eighteen non-EU nationals and players with European ancestry.

International players

Club

Management

Kit

|
|
|

Other information

Pre-season matches and friendlies 
Enosis left on 23 July for Pravets, Bulgaria to perform most of their pre-season training. The team returned on
4 August. While in Bulgaria Enosis played three friendly matches.

Competitions

Marfin Laiki League

Classification

Results summary

Results by round

Playoffs table

Matches
Time at EET

Cypriot Cup

First Round

References

Enosis Neon Paralimni FC seasons
Enosis